is a magical girl project created by Shaft. The story revolves around three adolescent girls who transform into the elemental 'Nanas' and fight against monsters. The project was first revealed in 2012, accompanied by a series of animated promotional videos and a pachislot series released by Daxel. A series of original video animation adaptations by Shaft began prescreening in late 2015.

Characters
 

The leader who wields the elemental power of fire. Her main weapon is a gauntlet she wears on her left arm. She is a happy go lucky girl who wishes to one day go on a rocket into outer space.
 

A polite girl who wields the power of earth. Her main weapon is a bow and arrow.
 

A shy girl who wields the power of water. Her main weapon is an electric guitar.
 

A girl who wields the power of electricity.

Production
The Prism Nana Project was first announced on August 1, 2012, revealing the project via a booth at Comiket 82 on August 10, 2012, where the first promotional trailer was shown. The series features original character designs by Kantoku, who previously illustrated The "Hentai" Prince and the Stony Cat. light novel series. Seven promotional pilot edition previews were released between September 30, 2012, and April 26, 2013. In July 2015, it was announced that an original video animation by Shaft would be released in late 2015. The project consists of seven episodes, each animated by different directors.

References

External links
Official website 

Magical girl anime and manga
Shaft (company)
Pachislot video games